Łukasz Surma (born 28 June 1977 in Kraków) is a Polish professional football manager and former player who is the current manager of III liga club Stal Stalowa Wola. He is the current record holder in number of appearances in Polish Ekstraklasa, as he played 559 matches.

Club career
He was a captain of Legia Warsaw for four years. With this team he won Polish Championship in 2006. In the past years he played for clubs like Ruch Chorzów and Wisła Kraków.

On 5 July 2007, Łukasz Surma signed for Israeli side Maccabi Haifa. He was loaned to Bnei Sakhnin where he was a regular starter, helping the team finish in 3rd place.

Managerial career
On 23 March 2022, Surma was appointed the successor of Łukasz Bereta at Stal Stalowa Wola.

National team
Surma has appeared five times for the Poland national team.

References

External links
 
 

1977 births
Living people
Polish footballers
Polish football managers
Poland international footballers
Wisła Kraków players
Ruch Chorzów players
Legia Warsaw players
Lechia Gdańsk players
Stal Stalowa Wola managers
Ekstraklasa players
Israeli Premier League players
Maccabi Haifa F.C. players
Bnei Sakhnin F.C. players
Polish expatriate footballers
Expatriate footballers in Israel
Expatriate footballers in Austria
Polish expatriate sportspeople in Israel
Polish expatriate sportspeople in Austria
Footballers from Kraków
Association football midfielders